Pickled walnuts are a traditional English pickle, made from walnuts. They are considered a suitable accompaniment for a dish of cold turkey or ham, as well as blue cheese. There is a reference to "a mutton chop and a pickled walnut" in The Pickwick Papers by Charles Dickens and a mention in Evelyn Waugh’s Brideshead Revisited.

The process for preparing pickled walnuts takes a little more than a week. The green walnuts are brined before they will be pickled. The brine time helps with preservation and removes some of the bitterness in the unripe walnuts.

History
Pickled walnuts have been a delicacy in England since at least the early 18th-century. They were mentioned in several literary works.

The botanist Richard Bradley describes pickled walnuts in his 1728 book The Country Housewife and Lady's Director,

The Compleat Housewife (London, 1727) gives a recipe for "Another Way to pickle Walnuts". They're first submerged in vinegar for around two months, then boiled in a solution of high-quality vinegar with flavourings: dill seeds, whole nutmeg, peppercorns, mace and ginger root. The walnuts and pickle boiling are poured into a crock until the mixture has cooled. The nuts are then transferred to a gallipot with a large clove-studded garlic clove, mustard seeds on top with spices, covered with vine leaves over which the pickling liquid is poured.

Pickled walnuts are still commonly eaten in England, particularly at Christmas served with an English blue cheese such as Stilton. They are also used in recipes, commonly cooked in beef dishes.

References in fiction 
Charles Dickens in his book The Pickwick Papers, published in 1836. In Chapter 49 he writes,

Pickled walnuts are also mentioned in Brideshead Revisited (1945) by Evelyn Waugh.  In Book 1, Chapter 1, Waugh writes,

Production
Pickled walnuts are made from the fruit of both common walnut tree varieties: Juglans regia, the Persian, royal, English or common walnut, and Juglans nigra, the black or American walnut.

The first stage is to pick the walnuts whilst they are still green and before the shells have set. Most recipes say in Britain that late June is about the best time to pick them, use of rubber gloves is recommended to protect the skin. The soft walnuts are then punctured with a fork and soaked in brine (salt water) for at least ten days. The walnuts are then drained and left to dry in the air. Soaking the walnuts in brine causes a chemical reaction to take place and the walnuts turn dark brown to black in colour when exposed to sunlight. The now-black walnuts are then placed into jars and a pickling solution poured over them. This can vary from a straightforward pickling vinegar to a solution containing spices and sugar. The walnuts are sealed and then left in the jars for anywhere between five days and eight weeks depending on which recipe is followed.

See also

References

Bibliography

External links

Walnuts in food and medicine

Walnuts
British condiments
Walnut dishes